Pedicab usually refer to the cycle rickshaw.

Pedicab may also refer to:
 Pedicab (band), a Filipino rock group
 "Pedicab Confessions", a The Apprentice (U.S. TV series) episode
 Pedicab Driver, a 1989 Hong Kong martial arts film
 Pedicab (film)

See also
 Rickshaw (disambiguation)